Rick Chrest is a Canadian politician who was elected mayor of Brandon, Manitoba in the 2014 municipal election defeating incumbent Shari Decter Hirst.

Prior to his election as mayor, Chrest served three terms on Brandon City Council for eleven years from 1995 to 2006 for University - Ward 8.

Chrest was acclaimed as mayor for a second term in the 2018 municipal election. This is the first uncontested mayoral race in the Wheat City in 26 years.

References

Mayors of Brandon, Manitoba
Living people
21st-century Canadian politicians
Year of birth missing (living people)